Main island is a term for the largest island in a country or group of islands.

Main Island may refer to:
 Grosse Ile (Michigan), an island in Michigan, nicknamed the "Main Island"
 Main Island (Michigan), an island within the state of Michigan
 Main Island, Willis Islands in the South Georgia Islands
 Main Island of Bermuda
 Honshu, Japan
 Singapore Island, Singapore